The following are the events in professional sumo during 1995.

Tournaments

Hatsu basho
Ryogoku Kokugikan, Tokyo, 8 January – 22 January

Haru basho
Osaka Prefectural Gymnasium, Osaka, 12 March – 26 March

Natsu basho
Ryogoku Kokugikan, Tokyo,  7 May – 21 May

Nagoya basho
Aichi Prefectural Gymnasium, Nagoya, 2 July – 16 July

Aki basho
Ryogoku Kokugikan, Tokyo, 10 September – 24 September

Kyushu basho
Fukuoka International Centre, Kyushu, 9 November – 23 November

News

January
In his debut tournament as a yokozuna, Takanohana wins his eighth makuuchi division championship in a playoff with ozeki Musashimaru after both finish on 13–2. Kaio wins the Outstanding Performance prize in his sekiwake debut. The Fighting Spirit prize is shared between Akinoshima and Daishoho. Asahiyutaka wins the juryo title after a playoff with Tosanoumi, and Kyokushuzan wins the makushita championship.

March
Takanohana's yokozuna rival Akebono responds by winning his eighth championship, defeating him on the final day to finish on 14–1. Veteran Terao wins the Outstanding Performance prize. Akinoshima scores 11–4 in his second successive tournament and wins his second Fighting Spirit Award in a row. Former maegashira Kototsubaki retires. Tokitsunada wins the juryo championship with a 10–5 record after a playoff with Shikishima.

May
Once again Akebono and Takanohana meet in a yusho deciding match. This time Takanohana wins to finish on 14–1. Musashimaru is third on 12–3, and Musoyama wins Outstanding Performance and Fighting Spirit prizes after a fine 11–4 record. Tosanoumi wins the juryo championship.

July
Takanohana wins his tenth championship with a 13–2 record, one ahead of Musashimaru. It is the fifth tournament in a row that Musashimaru has won twelve bouts or better. Kenko scores 11–4 and wins the Outstanding Performance prize, shared with Kotonishiki.  Musoyama wins the Technique Prize; it is the first time in a year that this prize has been awarded. Kotonowaka gets the Fighting Spirit Award. Tosanoumi makes his top division debut halfway up the maegashira ranks at #7, and fights an ozeki and a yokozuna in his first two bouts. He finishes on 7–8.  The juryo championship is won by Kyokushuzan. Chiyotaikai comes through with a winning record in his juryo debut. The Hawaiian wrestler Daiki (Percy Kipapa) wins the makushita championship with a perfect 7–0 record, ensuring his promotion to the sekitori ranks. The sandanme championship is won by Shiga (the future ozeki Tochiazuma). It is his third consecutive yusho and he is unbeaten in 25 bouts since his professional debut.

September
Takanohana wins his fourth yusho of the year, with a perfect 15–0 score. Akebono is runner-up, three wins behind. Kotonishiki wins the Technique prize, and Kaio the Outstanding Performance Award. Kotoinazuma scores 9–6 and wins the Fighting Spirit prize, earning promotion to the sanyaku ranks for the first time at the age of 33. His award is shared with Tosanoumi. Wakanojo wins the juryo title in his debut with a 12–3 record, three wins ahead of anyone else. Shiga's winning streak is stopped at 26, and he finishes with a 3–4 losing score in his debut in the makushita division. Former sekiwake Kotofuji, surprise winner of the July 1991 tournament, announces his retirement.

November
Ozeki Wakanohana wins his second career championship, defeating his brother Takanohana in a historic playoff after both men finish on 12–3. It is the first time the brothers have met in competition. Akebono pulls out midway through due to injury. Tosanoumi wins two special prizes for Technique and Outstanding Performance. Minatofuji wins the Fighting Spirit prize, shared with Kaio. Former maegashira Wakanoyama wins the juryo championship with an 11–4 score after a playoff with Daihisho. One win behind on 10–5 are Tamakasuga, who is promoted to makuuchi, and Hawaiian wrestler Sunahama (William Taylor Hopkins), in his juryo debut. Four former top division wrestlers announce their retirements: Takamisugi, Daishoyama, Kirinishiki and Komafudō.

Deaths
26 January: Former sekiwake Kurama, also former Shikoroyama Oyakata, aged 42.
31 March: Former maegashira Wakanoumi, also former Otake Oyakata aged 50.
4 June: Former maegashira Hideminato, aged 69.
20 July: Former maegashira Fukunoumi, also former Kitajin, Urakaze, Kiriyama, Hakkaku and Nakagawa Oyakata, aged 65.
16 Sept: Former maegashira Fukunosato, aged 71.
3 Oct: Former komusubi Kuninobori, also former Sanoyama Oyakata, aged 70.

See also
Glossary of sumo terms
List of past sumo wrestlers
List of years in sumo
List of yokozuna

Sumo by year
Sumo